Malcolm Campbell (1885–1948) was a British racing motorist and motoring journalist.

Malcolm Campbell may also refer to:

People
 Malcolm Campbell (cricketer) (1881–1967), Australian cricketer
 Malcolm Campbell (mayor), New Zealand mayor
 Malcolm Campbell-Johnston (1871–1938), British barrister and politician

Other uses
 Malcolm Campbell High School, a high school in Montreal, Canada, between 1960 and 1987